McAfee Peak is the highest mountain in the Independence Mountains of northern Elko County, Nevada, United States.  It ranks twenty-first among the most topographically prominent peaks in the state.  The peak is located within the Mountain City Ranger District of the Humboldt-Toiyabe National Forest.

Summit panorama

References

External links

Mountains of Elko County, Nevada
Mountains of Nevada
Humboldt–Toiyabe National Forest